Sentenza may refer to:

 Sentenza (Italian for "Verdict" or "Sentence"), also known as "Angel Eyes", the titular "Bad" in the movie The Good, the Bad and the Ugly, played by Lee Van Cleef.
 Akhenaton, a French rapper